The Pontins Professional was an invitational professional non-ranking snooker tournament which ran from 1974 until 2000.

History
Top snooker professionals had regularly supplemented their income from professional events by playing exhibition matches on the holiday camp circuit, with Pontins being a regular venue for entertaining holiday-makers. Beginning in 1974, a tournament involving eight professional players began at Pontins and became a regular point in the snooker calendar, usually occurring in the summer after the World Snooker Championship. This ran in conjunction with an Open tournament, in which many young amateur players took part, and provided a springboard for future stars such as Paul Hunter and Judd Trump. There were also juniors, seniors, and ladies events.

While top professional players regularly entered in the tournament's early years, the increase in the number of events on the snooker tour led to the biggest stars choosing not to enter in later years, and the professional tournament was last held in 2000.

Winners

Statistics

Finalists

Champions by country

See also
 1980 Pontins Camber Sands

References

 
Recurring sporting events established in 1974
Recurring sporting events disestablished in 2000
1974 establishments in Wales
2000 disestablishments in Wales
Snooker non-ranking competitions
Snooker competitions in Wales
Defunct snooker competitions
Defunct sports competitions in Wales